Fresno Crossing is an unincorporated community in Madera County, California.

Fresno Crossing was the main crossing point of the Stockton - Los Angeles Road on the Fresno River in the mining region.

References

Unincorporated communities in California
Unincorporated communities in Madera County, California